The Classification of European Inland Waterways is a set of standards for interoperability of large navigable waterways forming part of the Trans-European Inland Waterway network within Continental Europe and Russia.  It was created by the European Conference of Ministers of Transport (ECMT;) in 1992, hence the range of dimensions are also referred to as CEMT Class I–VII.

The size for each waterway is limited by the dimensions of the structures including the locks and boat lifts on the route.

Classification
Class I corresponds to the historical Freycinet gauge decreed in France during 1879.  The larger river classification sizes are focused on the carriage of intermodal containers in convoys of barges propelled by a push-tug.  Most of the canals of the United Kingdom have smaller locks and would fall below the dimensions in the European classification system.  In 2004, the standards were extended with four smaller sizes RA–RD covering recreational craft, which had originally been developed and proposed via PIANC.  The proposal to add the recreational sizes was adopted by United Nations Economic Commission for Europe resolution 52. In 2015 an updated version was published.

See also
Unified Deep Water System of European Russia (110-210m length max, 2,5-4m draft)
Baltimax (15,2m draft, the same as NeoPanamax)
Bangkok Port (8,2m draft)
Seawaymax (USA Great Lakes docks, 8,1m draft), Chesapeake & Delaware Canal (draft 10,7m)
Paraguay River (almost 2,5m in middle river, 1,6m in upper river)
Grand Canal (China)
Saimaa Canal (Finland, max length 82,5 m, beam 12,6m, draft 4,2m)

References

Publications including the full classification table 
 Waterway  article including a reference to the European classification
 Map of the European Inland Waterway Network, United Nations Economic Commission for Europe (4th edition, Geneva 2012), without the recreational navigation categories. Waterway Standards.
 European Waterways Map and Directory, 5th ed., David Edwards-May (Transmanche, 2014), 

Water transport in Europe
Transport and the European Union
Locks (water navigation)
Classification systems